The Democratic Union (DV) was a German political party in the German Empire.

The Union was founded in 1908 by former members of the Freeminded Union (Freisinnigen Vereinigung). The party demanded full equal voting rights for all, and a strict separation of church and state. It was not principled, or "revolutionary" against Wilhelmine Germany though.

Important party members were Theodor Barth, Rudolf Breitscheid (first chairman) and Hellmut von Gerlach. Carl von Ossietzky joined the party in 1908, and from 1911 onwards published the party's weekly Das freie Volk.

The First World War brought an end to the party. Hellmut von Gerlach, and some of his followers, helped found the German Democratic Party in 1918.

See also
Liberalism in Germany

References

Defunct political parties in Germany
Defunct liberal political parties
Political parties established in 1908
Political parties of the German Empire
Liberal parties in Germany
1908 establishments in Germany
1910s disestablishments in Germany
Political parties disestablished in the 1910s